The Miami Shores Thematic Resource — in Miami Shores, Miami-Dade County, Florida

List
The following buildings were added to the National Register of Historic Places as part of the Miami Shores Multiple Property Submission (or MPS).

Gallery

See also
National Register of Historic Places listings in Miami-Dade County, Florida

References

External links

 Dade County listings at National Register of Historic Places
 Dade County listings at Florida's Office of Cultural and Historical Programs

Miami Shores
National Register of Historic Places Multiple Property Submissions in Florida
Houses in Miami-Dade County, Florida